Attalus was a Stoic philosopher in the reign of Tiberius around 25 AD. He was defrauded of his property by Sejanus, and exiled where he was reduced to cultivating the ground. The elder Seneca describes him as a man of great eloquence, and by far the acutest philosopher of his age.

He taught the Stoic philosophy to Seneca the Younger, who frequently quotes him, and speaks of him in the highest terms. Seneca reminisces about Attalus in his 108th Letter:

In the same letter, Seneca describes some of the Stoic training he received from Attalus:

Of his written works, none survive. Seneca mentions a work of his on lightning; and it is supposed that he may be the author of the Proverbs referred to by Hesychius as written by one Attalus.

Notes

 

1st-century deaths
1st-century philosophers
Ancient Roman philosophers
Stoic philosophers
Year of birth unknown